Biolley is a district of the Buenos Aires canton, in the Puntarenas province of Costa Rica.

History 
Biolley was created on 7 November 1995 by Decreto Ejecutivo 24470-G.

Geography 
Biolley has an area of  km² and an elevation of  metres.

Demographics 

For the 2011 census, Biolley had a population of  inhabitants.

References 

Districts of Puntarenas Province
Populated places in Puntarenas Province